Ilya Nekolenko (born July 31, 1993) is a Russian professional ice hockey defenceman. He is currently playing with ORG Beijing in the Supreme Hockey League (VHL). He has formerly played in the Kontinental Hockey League (KHL).

Playing career
Nekolenko made his Kontinental Hockey League debut playing with Atlant Moscow Oblast during the 2012–13 KHL season. He has also played with HC Spartak Moscow and Severstal Cherepovets before signing a one-year contract with Croatian-based entrant club, KHL Medveščak Zagreb on June 17, 2015. He was later released from his contract without featuring with Zagreb to sign a new one-year contract with Metallurg Novokuznetsk on July 31, 2015.

After six seasons in his native Russia in the KHL, Nekolenko opted to pursue a North American career, signing an initial one-year contract for the 2018–19 season with the Reading Royals in the ECHL on September 4, 2018. After making 3 appearances with the Royals for 1 assist, Nekolenko was placed on waivers and claimed by the Newfoundland Growlers on November 12, 2018.

Personal
His younger brother, Arkhip (born March 11, 1996) was drafted in the first round, 20th overall, by Spartak Moscow in the 2013 KHL Junior Draft.

References

External links

1993 births
Living people
Atlant Moscow Oblast players
Metallurg Novokuznetsk players
HC Neftekhimik Nizhnekamsk players
Newfoundland Growlers players
Severstal Cherepovets players
HC Sibir Novosibirsk players
HC Spartak Moscow players
Reading Royals players
Russian ice hockey defencemen
HC Yugra players